The jugular veins are veins that take deoxygenated blood from the head back to the heart via the superior vena cava. The internal jugular vein descends next to the internal carotid artery and continues posteriorly to the sternocleidomastoid muscle.

Structure and Function
There are two sets of jugular veins: external and internal.
                                                              
The left and right external jugular veins drain into the subclavian veins. The internal jugular veins join with the subclavian veins more medially to form the brachiocephalic veins. Finally, the left and right brachiocephalic veins join to form the superior vena cava, which delivers deoxygenated blood to the right atrium of the heart. The Jugular veins help carry blood from the heart to and from the brain. An average human brain weighs about 3 pounds, and gets about 15%-20% of the blood that the heart pumps out. It is important for the brain to get enough blood for many reasons. The jugular vein has tributaries consisting of petrosal sinus, facial, lingual, pharylingual, the thyroid, and sometimes the occipital vein.

Internal

The internal jugular vein is formed by the anastomosis of blood from the sigmoid sinus of the dura mater and the inferior petrosal sinus. The internal jugular runs with the common carotid artery and vagus nerve inside the carotid sheath. It provides venous drainage for the contents of the skull.

External

The external jugular vein runs superficially to sternocleidomastoid.

There is also another minor jugular vein, the anterior jugular vein, draining the submaxillary region.

Clinical significance

Pressure

The jugular venous pressure is an indirectly observed pressure over the venous system. It can be useful in the differentiation of different forms of heart and lung disease.

In the jugular veins pressure waveform, upward deflections correspond with (A) atrial contraction, (C) ventricular contraction (and resulting bulging of perspicuous into the right atrium during isovolumic systole), and (V) atrial venous filling. The downward deflections correspond with (X) the atrium relaxing (and the perspicuous valve moving downward) and (y) the filling of ventricle after the tricuspid opens.

Components include:
 The a peak is caused by the contraction of the right atrium.
 The av minimum is due to relaxation of the right atrium and closure of the tricuspid valve.
 The c peak reflects the pressure rise in the right ventricle early during systole and the resultant bulging of the tricuspid valve—which has just closed—into the right atrium.
 The x minimum occurs as the ventricle contracts and shortens during the ejection phase, later in systole. The shortening heart—with tricuspid valve still closed—pulls on valve opens, the v peak begins to wane.
 The y minimum reflects a fall in right atrial pressure during rapid ventricular filling, as blood leaves the right atrium through an open tricuspid valve and enters the right ventricle. The increase in venous pressure after the y minimum occurs as venous return continues in the face of reduced ventricular filling.

Diseases and Conditions 
The jugular vein is prominent in heart failure. They can look at the veins pulses to tell if the heart is keeping up with what the body needs, by looking at how the vein is pumping blood to estimate the central venous pressure. Even if the vein appears to be bulging that is visible which is called, distension, this is another sign of heart failure. This can also show cardiac tamponade, and coronary artery disease

To examine the neck veins is to evaluate the atrial pressure and to estimate the intravascular volume. If venous pressure is high, the patient most likely has left or right ventricular failure or heart disease.

Common symptoms of conditions that can affect the jugular vein are, ear problems, such as hearing loss and dizziness, eye problems, can cause blurry vision and swollen eyes, pain in the neck or headaches and even problems with sleeping due to the change of blood flow to the brain.

Idiomatic expression
The jugular vein is the subject of an idiom in the English language:  "to go for the jugular" means to attack decisively at the weakest point in other words, to attack at the opportune juncture for a definitive resolution, or coup de grace.

An alternate explanation for the phrase suggests "to go for the jugular" merely means to attack without restraint. The jugular vein system is essential but not particularly weak or vulnerable, because this venous system is generally found fairly deep in the body.

See also
Chronic cerebrospinal venous insufficiency

References

Veins of the head and neck